Cristian Leandro González (born 13 January 1990) is an Argentine professional footballer who plays as a centre back for Deportivo Madryn.

Career
Deportivo Morón were the first club of González's senior career. He made one hundred and thirty-five appearances across seven seasons in Primera B Metropolitana, as he also scored six goals - with his first on 15 February 2010 against Almirante Brown. Whilst with the club, González spent the 2013–14 campaign out on loan in Torneo Argentino A with Unión Mar del Plata. Two goals in twenty-one fixtures in all competitions followed. González featured twice in the 2015 season for Deportivo Morón, prior to departing on 18 February 2015 to All Boys. He scored in his second match against Boca Unidos on 5 April.

After two goals and thirty-five games for All Boys in Primera B Nacional, González returned to the third tier with Defensores de Belgrano on 31 January 2016. Six months later, in June, González moved to Venezuela to join Primera División side Atlético Venezuela. He featured twenty-two times in 2016, as he received two red cards in the process. Thirteen appearances came in 2017, along with his first goal for Atlético Venezuela versus Deportivo Lara on 1 April 2017. In the succeeding August, González joined Villa Dálmine in Primera B Nacional. His first match came in April 2018; during a loss to Aldosivi.

Career statistics
.

References

External links

1990 births
Living people
People from Morón Partido
Argentine footballers
Association football defenders
Argentine expatriate footballers
Expatriate footballers in Venezuela
Argentine expatriate sportspeople in Venezuela
Primera B Metropolitana players
Torneo Argentino A players
Primera Nacional players
Venezuelan Primera División players
Deportivo Morón footballers
Unión de Mar del Plata footballers
All Boys footballers
Defensores de Belgrano footballers
Atlético Venezuela C.F. players
Villa Dálmine footballers
Deportivo Madryn players
Sportspeople from Buenos Aires Province